"Ohio (Come Back to Texas)" is a song by American rock band Bowling for Soup, released as a single from the group's album A Hangover You Don't Deserve (2004).

The song was used as a Wake-Up Call on Day 10 of the Space Shuttle Discovery's final mission, STS-133, at the request of the crew, on March 5, 2011.

Content
The singer's girlfriend leaves him after meeting another man at the bank and moves with him to Cleveland. The singer implores her to come back home to him and the distinctively Texan things she left behind in Denton County, Texas.

Charts

References

2005 singles
Bowling for Soup songs
Songs about Ohio
Songs about Texas
Songs written by Ted Bruner
Songs written by Jaret Reddick
Song recordings produced by Butch Walker
2004 songs
Jive Records singles
Songs written by Zac Maloy
Zomba Group of Companies singles